The Advanced Aeromarine Sierra was an American high-wing, strut-braced, single-seat, glider that was designed and produced by Advanced Aeromarine, as a kit for amateur construction.

Design and development
The Sierra was intended as a lightweight and affordable glider with modest performance that could be launched by ultralight aircraft aerotow, auto-tow, winch-launch or bungee launch. It first flew in March 1991.

The aircraft was made from aluminium tube, fabric and composites. Its  span wing was supported by a lift strut and jury struts. The landing gear was tandem wheels, plus a tail caster. The completion time from the factory kit was rated as 150 hours.

Only one prototype had been reported as completed by December 1998.

Operational history
In September 2011 there were no Sierras registered with the US Federal Aviation Administration and it is likely that none exist anymore.

Variants
Sierra LS
Main production version

Specifications (Sierra LS)

See also

References

1990s United States sailplanes
Homebuilt aircraft
Aircraft first flown in 1991
High-wing aircraft